"Worlds Apart" is a song co-written and recorded by the American country music artist Vince Gill. It was released in July 1996 as the second single from the album High Lonesome Sound. The song reached number 5 on the Billboard Hot Country Singles & Tracks chart and won Gill a Grammy Award for Best Male Country Vocal Performance. It was written by Gill and Bob DiPiero.

Content
The song is a ballad about a strained relationship.

Critical reception
Deborah Evans Price, of Billboard magazine reviewed the song favorably, calling the song "slow, stately, polished, but oozing with raw emotion."

Music video
The music video was directed by Jim Shea and was premiered in mid-1996. It is entirely black and white.

Chart performance
"Worlds Apart" entered the U.S. Billboard Hot Country Singles & Tracks at number 69  for the week of July 20, 1996.

Year-end charts

References

1996 singles
Vince Gill songs
Songs written by Vince Gill
Songs written by Bob DiPiero
Song recordings produced by Tony Brown (record producer)
MCA Records singles
1996 songs
Grammy Award for Best Male Country Vocal Performance winners